Marek Tomana (born 23 September 1979, in Czechoslovakia) is a professional footballer who is currently Chief Scout at Stirling Albion

Marek Tomana played for Tatran Prešov before signing for Stirling Albion. Tomana made his debut for Stirling Albion against Ayr United on 5 August 2006. Tomana has since made over 30 appearances for Stirling and scored 5 goals. Tomana was awarded the Stirling Albion.Com player of the year award for the 2006/07 season.

Tomana signed a loan deal with Cowdenbeath on 21 March 2008 until the end of the season. Tomana was released by Stirling Albion at the end of the 2007–08 season, and then signed for Cowdenbeath.

Notes

External links

1979 births
Living people
Cowdenbeath F.C. players
Expatriate footballers in Scotland
Scottish Football League players
Slovak expatriate footballers
Slovak footballers
Stirling Albion F.C. players
1. FC Tatran Prešov players
FC ViOn Zlaté Moravce players
Slovak Super Liga players
Montrose F.C. players
Association football midfielders
Slovak expatriate sportspeople in Scotland